Chisocheton cumingianus is a tree in the family Meliaceae. The tree is named for the English naturalist Hugh Cuming. Habitat is rain forests from sea-level to  altitude. C. cumingianus is found from India and tropical China through Indochina and throughout Malaysia. In the Philippines, the seeds of C. cumingianus (known locally as balukanag) are used to make a non-drying oil either for traditional medicine or as fuel for oil lamps.

Subspecies
Two subspecies are currently recognised: C. cumingianus subsp. balansae and C. cumingianus subsp. kinabaluensis.
C. cumingianus subsp. balansae This subspecies occurs on the Asian mainland.
C. cumingianus subsp. kinabaluensis This subspecies is endemic to Borneo and known only from Sabah. It grows as a large tree. The inflorescences are borne on the bole and are often very close to the ground.

References

cumingianus
Trees of China
Flora of tropical Asia
Plants described in 1878